The following is a timeline of the history of the city of Winston-Salem, North Carolina, USA.

Prior to 20th century

 1769 – Single Brothers' House built in Salem.
 1771 – Moravian cemetery ("God's Acre") in use in Salem.
 1784 – Salem Tavern rebuilt.
 1802 – Salem Academy for girls founded.
 1840 – Arista Cotton Mill and Fries Woolen Mills in business in Salem.
 1843 – Salem Vigilant Fire Company established.
 1849 – Salem becomes part of the newly formed Forsyth County.
 1851 – New town "Winston" created as seat of Forsyth County.
 1852 – Western Plank Road (Wilmington-Salem) built.
 1856
 Salem incorporated.
 Charles Brietz becomes first mayor of Salem.
 Western Sentinel newspaper begins publication in Salem.
 1859
 Winston incorporated.
 William Barrow becomes first mayor of Winston.
 1861
 St. Philips Moravian Church built in Salem.
 May 20: State of North Carolina secedes from the Union.
 1866 – First National Bank of Salem established.
 1871 – First tobacco factory in Winston begins operating.
 1872 – P.H. Hanes & Co. tobacco in business in Winston.
 1875 – R. J. Reynolds Tobacco Company in business in Winston.
 1879 – Wachovia National Bank established in Winston.
 1890 – Twin-City Daily Sentinel newspaper in publication.
 1891 – First Catholic Mass held at St. Leo's original church site in the West End.
 1896 – Population: 5,500 in Salem; 13,500 in Winston.
 1897 – The Journal newspaper begins publication.
 1899 – Winston-Salem post office established in Winston.

20th century
 1905 – Baseball comes to Winston-Salem
 1912 – Winston-Salem Hebrew Congregation formed.
 1913 – Towns of Salem and Winston merge to form Winston-Salem municipality.
 1918 – November: Racial unrest.
 1923 – North Carolina Baptist Hospital opens.
 1927 –
 Nissen Building completed - would later be the first building in the Southeastern US to install air conditioning. 
 Miller Municipal Airport established.
 1929 – Reynolds Building (hi-rise) constructed.
 1930
 WSJS radio begins broadcasting.
 Shell-shaped Shell Service Station built.
 1935 – State Theatre active.
 1937
 WAIR radio begins broadcasting.
 Krispy Kreme donuts in business.
 1948 – Piedmont Airlines headquartered in city.
 1951 – Flamingo Drive-In cinema opens.
 1952 – Temple Emanuel synagogue built.
 1953 – WSJS-TV begins broadcasting.
 1956 – Wake Forest College relocates to Winston-Salem.
 1960 – Winston-Salem exceeds 100,000 for the first time.
 1965
 Hanes Corporation headquartered in city.
 Museum of Early Southern Decorative Arts established.
 Parkway Theatre opens.
 1966 – Wachovia Building (hi-rise) constructed.
 1967 – November: Racial unrest.
 1971 – Black Panther Party, Winston-Salem, North Carolina Chapter established.
 1975 – Hanes Mall opens.
 1979 – WGNN-TV begins broadcasting.
 1981 – Wake Forest University's Layton Field baseball park opens.
 1982
 Second Harvest Food Bank begins operating.
 Southern Garden History Society headquartered in Winston-Salem.
 RJR Plaza Building constructed.
 1989 – Lawrence Joel Veterans Memorial Coliseum opens.
 1993 – Mel Watt becomes U.S. representative for North Carolina's 12th congressional district.
 1995 – Wachovia Center (hi-rise) built.
 1997
 City website online (approximate date).
 Winston Net (computer training nonprofit) established.
 Jack Cavanagh becomes mayor.
 2000 
 Population exceeds 200,000 for the first time.
 Sister city relationship established with Ungheni, Moldova.

21st century
 2001
 Allen Joines becomes mayor.
 Sister city relationship established with Kumasi, Ghana.
 2005 – Winston Cup Museum opened by Will Spencer.
 2006 – Sister city relationship established with Nassau, Bahamas and Shanghai, China.
 2008 – Wachovia Bank is acquired by Wells Fargo.
 2010 – Population: 229,617.
 2011 
 Sister city relationship established with Buchanan, Liberia.
 Tennis tournament Winston-Salem Open moves here from New Haven, Connecticut
 2014 – Alma Adams becomes U.S. representative for North Carolina's 12th congressional district.
 2019 
 Confederate soldier statue on the former grounds of the Forsyth County Courthouse removed after protests and legal challenges.
 BB&T acquires SunTrust Banks, forming Truist Financial headquartered in Charlotte, North Carolina

See also
 Winston-Salem history
 List of mayors of Winston-Salem, North Carolina
 National Register of Historic Places listings in Forsyth County, North Carolina
 Timelines of other cities in North Carolina: Asheville, Charlotte, Durham, Fayetteville, Greensboro, Raleigh, Wilmington

References

Bibliography

 
 
 1908 ed.
 
 . + Chronology

External links

 
 
  (local history collection)
 Items related to Winston-Salem, NC, various dates (via Digital Public Library of America).
 

 
winston